Gili may refer to :

People
Gili Cohen, Israeli Olympic judoka
Gili Haimovitz (born 1993), Israeli taekwando fighter
Gili Landau (born 1958), Israeli footballer and manager

Other
Gili, Iran
Gili Islands, an archipelago of three small islands off the northwest coast of Lombok, Indonesia.

See also 
Gillyweed, in Harry Potter's stories.